Ahmed Harbi Mahajna (born 16 July 1986), simply known as Ahmed Harbi, is a Palestinian footballer playing for Maccabi Ahi Iksal as a full back, having previously played in the Israeli league.

International career 
He received his first call up to the Palestine national football team in 2010 against Sudan. He has since played for Palestine at the 2010 WAFF Championship, the qualifying rounds of 2012 AFC Challenge Cup, 2014 World Cup qualifying and the 2015 AFC Asian Cup. He scored his first goal for the national team against Myanmar in the final game of 2012 AFC Challenge Cup qualifying. He was the first player to be sent off in the 2015 AFC Asian Cup.

Career statistics

International

References

1986 births
Living people
Arab citizens of Israel
Israeli footballers
Palestinian footballers
Israeli emigrants to Palestine
Hapoel Umm al-Fahm F.C. players
Hapoel Haifa F.C. players
Maccabi Umm al-Fahm F.C. players
Sektzia Ness Ziona F.C. players
Markaz Shabab Al-Am'ari players
Hapoel Bnei Lod F.C. players
Ahli Al-Khaleel players
Shabab Al-Dhahiriya SC players
Liga Leumit players
West Bank Premier League players
Palestine international footballers
2015 AFC Asian Cup players
Association football fullbacks
Footballers from Umm al-Fahm